HQ may refer to:
 Headquarters
 High quality (disambiguation)

Games
 HQ (video game), a live trivia game app
 HeroQuest (role-playing game)
 Chase H.Q., an arcade racing game

Businesses and utilities
 HQ an imprint of HarperCollins
 HQ Bank, a Swedish investment bank
 Home Quarters Warehouse, a defunct retail chain
 Harmony Airways' IATA airline designator
 Thomas Cook Airlines Belgium's defunct IATA airline code

Other uses
 HQ (album), a 1975 album by Roy Harper
 HAVE QUICK, a frequency-hopping system used to protect military UHF radio traffic
 Geely HQ (Haoqing), a car model
 Holden HQ, a range of car models
 Twickenham Stadium or HQ, a rugby union stadium in London, England
 Howland Island's FIPS PUB 10-4 territory code